The John Bishop Show is a British comedy-variety show presented by Liverpudlian award-winning stand-up comedian John Bishop. The show has aired on ITV in the UK, and Virgin Media One in Ireland from January 2022.

The show is co-produced by Lola Entertainment, which also produced the 2015 series of the same name for BBC One.

ITV confirmed that the show had been recommissioned for a second series in 2023, which will be preceded by an end of the year special in December 2022.

Series overview

Episodes

References

External links

2020s British comedy television series
2022 British television series debuts
British variety television shows
English-language television shows
ITV comedy
Television series by ITV Studios
Television series reboots